Wilhelm Maribo Schøyen (October 21, 1844 – May 8, 1918) was a Norwegian entomologist. He was Norway's first government entomologist.

Wilhelm Maribo Schøyen is considered one of Norway's most prominent entomologists. He was an avid writer and left behind a large collection of scientific publications. He was the father of the government entomologist Thor Hiorth Schøyen.

Entomologist
Schøyen was born in Grue, Norway. He graduated from Ås Higher Agricultural School in 1867. He had also begun medical studies, but he did not finish because of health issues. From 1884 to 1891, Schøyen was a curator at the Oslo Zoological Museum, where he reviewed and systematized the museum's collection of lower animal groups. He started working as an agricultural entomologist in 1891. Every year he published a report on insect pests and plant diseases. These included reports from all over Norway, and also some about the biology of pests and how to fight them. In 1894, Schøyen became Norway's first government entomologist. He held this position until 1912. Schøyen was a member of the Norwegian Academy of Science and Letters. He was also present when the Norwegian Entomological Society was founded in 1904.

Insect collector
During his travels in Norway, Schøyen focused on collecting butterflies. In 1893 he published Fortegnelse over Norges Lepidoptera (Inventory of Norway's Lepidoptera). In addition, he collected mushrooms and several other taxa of insects. These especially included agricultural pests, about which he wrote many popular science articles. His extensive insect collection is kept at the Oslo Zoological Museum today.

Awards and recognitions 
Wilhelm Maribo Schøyen was named a knight of the Order of St. Olav in 1915.

Selected works
Schøyen authored more than 300 popular science and research publications. These include seven books, 70 research articles, 26 annual reports, and almost 200 popular science articles in magazines and journals. A complete list of Schøyen's works was compiled by Leif Reinhart Natvig. A list of his most important publications was published in the first issue of Norsk Entomologisk Tidsskrift in 1921 (dated 1920).
 1867: "Nogle Ord om Hakkespetterne, Skogeierens tro og flittige Hjælpere" (Some Words about Woodpeckers: The Forest Owner's Faithful and Diligent Helpers), in Landmarks Tidsskrift for det praktiske Landbrug
 1868: "Rognetræet" (The Rowan Tree), in Landmarks Tidsskrift for det praktiske Landbrug
 1868: "Meldøieren" (The Ergots), in Landmarks Tidsskrift for det praktiske Landbrug
 1870: "Potetessygen" (The Potato Disease), in Landmarks Tidsskrift for det praktiske Landbrug
 1871: "Græsmarkerne" (Pastures), in Landmarks Tidsskrift for det praktiske Landbrug
 1870–74: Minor contributions published in Norsk Folkeblad and Magazin for Naturkundskab
 1875: De for Ager, Eng og Have skadeligste Insekter og Smaakryb (The Insects and Bugs Most Harmful to Fields, Meadows, and Gardens). Supplement to the magazine Folkevennen, published by the Society for the Promotion of Popular Education (Selskabet til Folkeoplysningens Fremme)
 1875: "Fortegnelse over Sommerfugle fundne i Søndre Odalen" (Inventory of Butterflies Found in Sør-Odal), in Nyt Magazin for Naturvidenskaberne
 1876: De i Husene skadeligste Insekter og Midder (The Most Harmful Insects and Mites in Houses), supplement to the magazine Folkevennen
 1878: "Bidrag til Gudbrandsdalens og Dovrefjelds Insektfauna" (Contribution to the Insect Fauna of the Gudbrand Valley and Dovrefjell), in Nyt Magazin for Naturvidenskaberne
 1879: "Fortsat Bidrag til Gudbrandsdalens og Dovrefjelds Insektfauna" (Contribution to the Insect Fauna of the Gudbrand Valley and Dovrefjell, Continued), in Nyt Magazin for Naturvidenskaberne
 1879: "Supplement til H. Siebkes Enumeratio insectorum Norvegicorum Fasc. I og II" (Supplement to H. Siebke's Inventory of Norwegian Insects Fascicles 1 and 2), in Forhandlinger i Videnskabsselskabet i Christiania
 1880: "Bemerkninger til H. Siebkes Enumeratio ins. Norv. Fasc. V. Pars I" (Comments on H. Siebke's Inventory of Norwegian Insects Fascicle 5, Part 1), in Forhandlinger i Videnskabsselskabet i Christiania.
 1880: "Efterskrift til Wallengren 'Forsök att bestämma en del utaf H. Ström beskrifna Norska Insekter'" (Postscript to Wallengren's Attempt to Identify Some Norwegian Insects Described by H. Ström), in Forhandlinger i Videnskabsselskabet i Christiania
 1880: "Lepidopterologiske Bidrag til Norges Fauna" (Lepidopterological Contributions to Norwegian Fauna), in Nyt Magazin for Naturvidenskab
 1880: "Oversigt over de i Norges arktiske Region hidtil fundne Lepidoptera" (Overview of Lepidoptera found in Norway's Arctic Region to Date), in Arkiv for Mathematik og Naturvidenskab
 1880: "Om Furuspinderens (Eutrichia pini) Optræden i Norge i Aarene 1812–16" (On the Occurrence of the Pine-Tree Lappet (Eutrichia pini) in Norway in the Years 1812–16) and Coleopterologiske Notitser (Coleopterological Notes), in Entomologisk Tidsskrift (Stockholm)
 1881: "Lepidopterologiske Undersøgelser i Romsdals amt sommeren 1880" (Lepidopterological Investigations in Romsdal County in the Summer of 1880), in Nyt Magazin for Naturvidenskab
 1881: "Om nogle for Norges og tildels ogsaa for Skandinaviens Fauna nye Lepidoptera" (Some New Lepidoptera for Norway's and Partly Also Scandinavia's Fauna), in Forhandlinger i Videnskabs-selskabet i Christiania
 1881: "Ueber einige neue Schmetterlings-Varietäten aus dem arktischen Norwegen" (Some New Butterfly Varieties from Arctic Norway), in Entomologisk Tidsskrift (Stockholm)
 1882: "Nye Bidrag til Kundskaben om det arktiske Norges Lepidopterfauna" (New Contributions to the Knowledge of Arctic Norway's Lepidoptera Fauna), in Tromsø museums aarshefter 4 and 5
 1882: "Bemerkninger om Lycaena argus-aegon-Gruppen" (Comments on the Lycaena argus/aegon Group), in Entomologisk Tidsskrift (Stockholm)
 1884: "Om Forekomsten av Insekter i Menneskets Legeme" (The Occurrence of Insects in the Human Body), in Naturen
 1884: "Om Micropteryx-Larvernes Optræden i vore Birkeskove" (The Occurrence of Micropterix Larvae in Our Birch Forests), in Entomologisk Tidsskrift (Stockholm)
 1884 "Tilvæxt til Norges Lepidopterfauna fra de senere aar" (Growth in Norway's Lepidoptera Fauna in Recent Years), in Entomologisk Tidsskrift (Stockholm)
 1884: "Nogle Exempler paa Insekters Masseoptræden i de sidste Par Aar" (Some Examples of Mass Occurrences of Insects in the Last Few Years), in Entomologisk Tidsskrift (Stockholm)
 1885: "Bemaerkninger om enkelte Variationer af vore Rhopalocerer" (Notes on Some Variations of our Rhopalocera), in Entomologisk Tidsskrift (Stockholm)
 1885: "Tillæg og Berigtigelser til Norges Lepidopterfauna" (Additions and Corrections to Norway's Lepidoptera Fauna), in Forhandlinger i Videnskabs-selskabet i Christiania
 1885: "Bygaalen (Tylenchus Hordei n. sp.) en ny for Bygget skadelig Planteparasit blandt Rundormene" (Tylenchus hordei n. sp., A New Nematode Plant Parasite Harmful to Barley), in Forhandlinger i Videnskabs-selskabet i Christiania
 1886: "Om Forekomsten af Dipterlarver under Huden hos Mennesker" (The Presence of Diptera Larvae under Human Skin), in Entomologisk Tidsskrift (Stockholm)
 1887: "Analytisk Oversigt over de skandinaviske Slægter af phytophage Hymenoptera" (An Analytical Overview of the Scandinavian Species of Plant-Eating Hymenoptera), in Entomologisk Tidsskrift (Stockholm)
 1887: "Yderligere Tillæg til Norges Lepidopterfauna" (A Further Supplement to Norway's Lepidoptera Fauna), in Forhandlinger i Videnskabs-selskabet i Christiania
 1887: "Supplement til H. Siebkes Enum. Ins. Norv. Fasc. V. Pars I" (Supplement to H. Siebke's Inventory of Norwegian Insects Fascicle 5, Part 1), in Forhandlinger i Videnskabs-selskabet i Christiania
 1887: "Fortegnelse over de i Norge hidtil fundne Neuroptera planipennia og Pseudo-Neuroptera" (A List of Neuroptera-Planipennia and Pseudo-Neuroptera found in Norway So Far), in Forhandlinger i Videnskabs-selskabet i Christiania
 1888: "Norsk entomologisk Litteratur" (Norwegian Entomological Literature), in Entomologisk Tidsskrift (Stockholm), continued annually until 1896.
 1889: "Bidrag til Kundskaben om Norges Orthopter- og Hemipterfaunae" (Contribution to the Knowledge of Norway's Orthoptera and Hemiptera Fauna), in Forhandlinger i Videnskabs-selskabet i Christiania
 1889: "Supplement til H. Siebke's Enum. Insect. Norv. Fasc. IV" (Supplement to H. Siebke's Inventory of Norwegian Insects Fascicle 4), in Forhandlinger i Videnskabs-selskabet i Christiania
 1890: "Notes on Dr. Jordan's Entomological Ramble at Bergen," in Entomologist's Monthly Magazine (London)
 1890: "Nye Bidrag til Norges Lepidopterfauna" (New Contributions to Norway's Lepidoptera Fauna), in Entomologisk Tidsskrift (Stockholm)
 1890: "Om skadellg Optræden paa Bygagrene av den mørke Aadselbille (Silpha opaca L.)" (The Harmful Occurrence of the Dark Carrion Beetle (Silpha opaca L.) in Barley Fields), in Norsk Landmandsblad
 1890: "Om Brandsygdomme paa Kornagrene" (Smut Diseases in Grain Fields), in Norsk Landmandsblad
 1890: "Menneskets vigtigste Indvoldsorme og deres Udviklingshistorie" (The Most Important Intestinal Worms in Humans and Their Development History), supplement to the magazine Folkevennen
 1891: "Om Fjeldbirkemaaleren (Cidaria dilutata S. V.)" (The November Moth, Cidaria dilutata S. V.), in Den norske Turistforenings Aarbog
 1893: "Fortegnelse over Norges Lepidoptera" (List of Norway's Lepidoptera), in Forhandlinger i Videnskabs-selskabet i Christiania
 1894: "Om Anvendelsen af insekt- og sopfordrivende Midler i Havebruget" (The Use of Insecticides and Fungicides in Horticulture), in Norsk Havetidende, later published separately in multiple editions
 1894–1912: Annual reports and announcements as government entomologist
 1896: "En Cossus-Larves Forekomst i Maven hos et Menneske" (Occurrence of a Cossus Larva in the Stomach of a Human), in Norsk Magazin for Lægevidenskab
 1913: Zoologi for Landbruksskolen (Zoology for the Agricultural School; Kristiania: Aschehoug & Co.)
 1914: "Insekt og sopskade paa gran- og furukongler" (Insect and Fungal Damage to Spruce and Pine Cones), in Tidsskrift for skovbrug
 1914: "Skadeinsekter i frø- og plantesenger" (Harmful Insects in Seed and Plant Beds), in Tidsskrift for skovbrug
 1914: "Eplesugere og bladtæger paa epletrær" (Apple Psyllids and Capsid Bugs on Apple Trees), in Ukeskrift for Landbruk

References

External links
 Wilhelm Maribo Schøyen's family tree at Geni.com

Norwegian entomologists
People from Grue, Norway
Order of Saint Olav
1844 births
1918 deaths
Members of the Norwegian Academy of Science and Letters